Ek Cup Cha() is a 2014 Bangladeshi romantic film directed by Noyeem Imtiaz Neyamul. It stars Ferdous Ahmed and Moushumi in the central roles, alongside Omar Sani, Rituparna Sengupta, father and daughter duo Alamgir and Akhi Alamgir, and Humayun Faridi. It is Faridi's final film, he died before it was released.

The shooting of Ek Cup Cha started on October 15, 2010. But for different circumstances regarding producers, it cannot be released. It is the first film produced by actor Ferdous Ahmed. It was finally released in 60 cinema halls in Bangladesh on November 28, 2014.

Story
A professor of English of a college Shafiq (Ferdous Ahmed) fall in love with a librarian Deepa (Moushumi). But he cannot tell this to her. He used to keep rose on Deepa's table every day. Suddenly, he decides to tell her about his love and asked Deepa to take a cup of tea with him. He faces some difficulties in his way. Kolkata super star Rituparna Sengupta is seen in a bar in a special appearance. Humayun Faridi acted as a doctor in this film.

Cast
 Ferdous Ahmed as Shafiqur Rahman
 Moushumi as Deepa
 Rituporna Sengupta as Dilruba
 Dr.Ezazul Islam as Mr.Gomez, Deepa landowner
 Monira Mithu as Mrs. Gomez, Deepa's landowners wife
 Kabila as Facebook
 Nayok Raj Razzak
 Humayun Faridi as Dr Afzal Chowdhury
 Amol Bose
 Alamgir
 Ankhi Alamgir
 Mir Sabbir
 Nipun
 Shakib Khan as Himself (special appearance)
 Emon as Special Appearance
 Nirob as Special Appearance
 Shahidul Alam Sachchu
 Omar Sani
 Ahmed Sharif as Police Inspector
 Anis as grocery shopkeeper
 Saif Babu as Salman
 Humaira Himu as Rosy
 Farhana Nisho as News Presenter

Soundtrack
The music of this film was composed by Emon Saha and lyrics were penned by Kabir Bakul. Lilua Batas Soi Go, a song by popular writer Humayun Ahmed has been included in the film. Before his death, it was his last penned song.

Reception

Critical response
Rafi Hossain and M. H. Haider, writing for The Daily Star, called the film "at best, above average" and said, "One may argue that the film was a bit overhyped; and many among the audience might not have had their expectations met."

Accolades
 Meril Prothom Alo Awards

 Critics Choice Award for Best Film Actress - Moushumi - Won

 National Film Awards

 Best Actor - Ferdous Ahmed - Won

 BACHSAS Awards

 Best Actor - Ferdous Ahmed - Won

References

External links
 Ek Cup Cha on BMDb

2014 films
Bengali-language Bangladeshi films
Films scored by Emon Saha
2010s Bengali-language films